The Choir of Salisbury Cathedral exists to sing services in Salisbury Cathedral, Wiltshire, England, and has probably been in existence since the consecration of the cathedral in 1258.

The choir comprises twenty boy choristers and twenty girl choristers aged from 8 to 13 years and six professional Lay Vicars singing countertenor, tenor and bass. Salisbury Cathedral was the first English cathedral to recruit girl choristers (in 1991) and, when in the cathedral, the girls' choir is usually wholly independent of the boys'. The weekly services are equally divided between the boy and girl choristers throughout the school year.

The choristers are educated at Salisbury Cathedral School, which is situated in the Cathedral Close. The Lay Vicars live locally.

In addition to services, the choir is involved in BBC broadcasts, concerts, CD recordings and the annual Southern Cathedrals Festival. The choir also broadcasts frequently on BBC Radio 3 and BBC Radio 4. A documentary programme about the choir was shown on BBC4 television in March 2012 under the title Angelic Voices; it included episodes in the life of the members of both choirs over a four-month period.

The choir is directed by the Director of Music, currently David Halls, and accompanied by the Assistant Organist, plus an organ scholar, who is selected by audition on an annual basis.

Tours
In previous years the boys and men have travelled to Latvia, Estonia and France; the girls have visited Italy and Austria. In 2009 the boys and men of Salisbury Cathedral Choir made their first visit to Salisbury's twinned city of Saintes, France, a visit they repeated together with the girls choir in 2014. Another tour to Salisbury's other twin town of Xanten, Germany, took place just after Easter 2016.

Recordings
Recent recordings include:
2019 - Poetry in Music: Musical Settings of Words by George Herbert
 2017 - Music for Sunday
 2016 - Complete Psalms of David Volume 9 Series 2
 2013 - Great Hymns from Salisbury
 2009 - Christmas at Salisbury Cathedral
 2009 - Bernard Naylor - The Nine Motets
 2009 – Anthems from Salisbury
 2008 – Christmas Carols from Wells and Salisbury
 2008 – The Resurrection
 2006 - The Virgin Mary's Journey
 2004 - Praise and Thanksgiving: Anthems from Salisbury
 2003 - King of Glory: Evensong from Salisbury
 2001 - Angels' Song: The New Music of Salisbury Cathedral
 2001 – From Darkness to Light
 1997 – Britten: Spring Symphony
 1997 – Sing Choirs of Angels
 1996 – An English Chorister's Songbook

Notable former choristers

Edward Lowe (composer) (c.1602 – 1682)
Sir Stephen Fox (1627 – 1716)
Bernard Rose (musician) (1916–1996)
Nicholas Daniel (born 1962), oboist

See also
Anglican church music

References

External links
Choristers at Salisbury Cathedral School
Cathedral Friends annual report re music
Recent music lists
Video about the choristers
A history of the choristers

Girls' and women's choirs
English choirs
Organisations based in Wiltshire
1258 establishments in England
Musical groups established in the 13th century
Organizations established in the 1250s
Choir